Terrence Deshon Williams (born June 28, 1987) is an American former professional basketball player. Williams was drafted 11th overall in the 2009 NBA draft by the New Jersey Nets. He was the senior co-captain for Rick Pitino's 2008–09 University of Louisville Cardinals.

Early career

At Rainier Beach High School, Williams was a four-year starter on the basketball team. He helped the team to a state title in 2003. He averaged 21.7 points his senior year. He was also a starting wide receiver and free safety on the football team. He considered attending Indiana and Kansas before deciding to play for Pitino.

Afterwards, he attended Louisville. In the 2007–08 season, Williams achieved the third and fourth triple-doubles in Louisville basketball history (the first two by Samaki Walker and Ellis Myles). He racked up 14 points, 13 assists and 12 rebounds in the Cardinals' season-opening 104-69 win over Hartford and had 10 points, 10 rebounds, and 10 assists in a January 19, 2008 loss to Seton Hall.

He was also a finalist in the Lowe's Senior Class Award and was named to the Lowe's Senior Class All-Senior All-America first team.

Williams has extraordinary overall athletic abilities as recognized by coach Rick Pitino.  "He's a freakish athlete", Pitino said.  He is known for his slam dunking abilities and won the dunk contest at the 2005 Kentucky Derby Basketball Classic.

Professional career

New Jersey Nets (2009–2010) 

Williams was drafted by the New Jersey Nets with the 11th overall pick in the 2009 NBA draft and was signed to a four-year contract. In the teams' now annual summer workouts, he dazzled his teammates and coaches with his athleticism, defense, and passing.

He recorded his first career triple-double April 9, 2010, with 27 points, 13 rebounds, and 10 assists in the Nets double overtime win over the Chicago Bulls 127–116.

On November 26, 2010, the Nets sent Williams to the Springfield Armor of the NBA D-League. Williams was recalled on December 7, 2010.

Houston Rockets (2010–2012) 
On December 15, 2010, Williams was traded to the Houston Rockets in a three-team trade involving the Nets and Los Angeles Lakers. On March 16, 2012, Williams was waived by the Rockets.

Sacramento Kings (2012) 
After being waived by the Rockets, Williams signed a 10-day contract with the Sacramento Kings on March 21, 2012. He was signed for the remainder of the season on March 31, 2012.

Guangdong Southern Tigers (2012–2013) 
In October 2012, Williams joined the Detroit Pistons for their training camp. On October 22, 2012, Williams was waived by the Detroit Pistons.

In November 2012, he joined the Guangdong Southern Tigers of China. He left the Tigers in February 2013.

Boston Celtics (2013) 
On February 20, 2013, Williams signed a 10-day contract with the Boston Celtics. On March 3, 2013, Williams re-signed to a multi-year contract with the Celtics. On June 30, 2013, he was waived by the Celtics.

Türk Telekom (2013) 
In October 2013, Williams signed with Türk Telekom. He parted ways with them on November 14, after playing only two games in Turkish Basketball League.

Los Angeles D-Fenders (2013–2014) 
On December 31, 2013, Williams was acquired by the Los Angeles D-Fenders. He set the D-Fenders franchise single-game scoring record with 50 points on January 31, 2014 against the Idaho Stampede, surpassing 49 earlier that season by Manny Harris.

Brujos de Guayama (2014) 
In April 2014, Williams signed with Brujos de Guayama of Puerto Rico. He was waived on May 1, 2014.

Meralco Bolts (2014) 
On May 18, 2014, Williams signed with Meralco Bolts, but left seven days later after just three games.

Soles de Santo Domingo (2014) 
Williams joined Soles de Santo Domingo of the Dominican Republic in 2014.

Reales de La Vega (2014) 
Williams joined Reales de La Vega of the Dominican Republic in 2014.

Fuerza Regia (2014–2015) 
On December 26, 2014, WIlliams signed with Fuerza Regia of Mexico. In his first game, he scored 19 points in the game that Fuerza Regia won 101-85 against Gigantes Estado de Mexico. Williams also grabbed 2 rebounds and has 6 assists.

Vaqueros de Bayamón (2015) 
On January 17, 2015, Williams signed with Maccabi Ashdod of Israel. Ten days later, he left the club before playing in a single game for them. In March 2015, he signed with Vaqueros de Bayamón of Puerto Rico. He was released by the club after appearing in just two league games.

Guaiqueríes de Margarita (2015) 
In April 2015, Williams signed with Guaiqueríes de Margarita of Venezuela for the rest of the 2015 LPB season.

On October 6, 2015, Williams signed with the upcoming AmeriLeague to play on the following season. However, the league folded after it was discovered the founder was a con artist.

NBA career statistics

Regular season

|-
| align="left" | 
| align="left" | New Jersey
| 78 || 9 || 22.6 || .401 || .310 || .715 || 4.5 || 2.9 || .6 || .1 || 8.4
|-
| align="left" | 
| align="left" | New Jersey
| 10 || 0 || 20.6 || .397 || .333 || .500 || 3.6 || 3.1 || .5 || .0 || 6.7
|-
| align="left" | 
| align="left" | Houston
| 11 || 0 || 7.6 || .333 || .200 || .818 || 1.4 || .6 || .4 || .0 || 3.5
|-
| align="left" | 
| align="left" | Houston
| 12 || 0 || 15.1 || .351 || .421 || .500 || 2.4 || .8 || .3 || .1 || 4.5
|-
| align="left" | 
| align="left" | Sacramento
| 18 || 0 || 20.5 || .461 || .296 || .618 || 4.1 || 3.1 || .9 || .3 || 8.8
|-
| align="left" | 
| align="left" | Boston
| 24 || 0 || 13.3 || .495 || .333 || .429 || 1.8 || 1.6 || .5 || .1 || 4.6
|-
| style="text-align:left;"| Career
| style="text-align:left;"| 
| 153 || 9 || 19.1 || .412 || .317 || .659 || 3.6 || 2.4 || .5 || .1 || 7.1

Playoffs

|-
| align="left" | 2013
| align="left" | Boston
| 5 || 0 || 9.6 || .200 || .000 || .500 || 2.0 || 1.2 || .0 || .2 || 1.0
|-
| style="text-align:left;"| Career
| style="text-align:left;"| 
| 5 || 0 || 9.6 || .200 || .000 || .500 || 2.0 || 1.2 || .0 || .2 || 1.0

Personal life

Williams has estimated that he owns over 300 pairs of sneakers. His nickname is "T-Will". His son, Jaraye Williams, is considered a 4-star football prospect in the class of 2021, according to various recruiting outlets. Jaraye is considered a legacy recruit, as he's committed to Louisville.

On October 7, 2021, the US Attorney for the Southern District of New York, Audrey Strauss, arrested Williams and 15 others in connection with an alleged scheme to defraud the NBA's health plan, in which nearly $4 million in fraudulent claims appear to have been made. Strauss referred to Williams as the leader of the conspiracy. The charges allege that Williams obtained fraudulent medical and dental invoices, sent them to his co-conspirators - which include other former NBA players - and claims were submitted by the aforementioned co-conspirators to the plan, which paid "most" claims for medical care never rendered. A total of 19 people are charged in this indictment on counts of conspiracy to commit health care fraud and wire fraud.

See also
2009 NCAA Men's Basketball All-Americans

References

External links

Eurobasket.com profile
FIBA.com profile

1987 births
Living people
All-American college men's basketball players
American expatriate basketball people in China
American expatriate basketball people in the Dominican Republic
American expatriate basketball people in Mexico
American expatriate basketball people in the Philippines
American expatriate basketball people in Turkey
American expatriate basketball people in Venezuela
American men's basketball players
Basketball players from Seattle
Boston Celtics players
Fuerza Regia de Monterrey players
Guaiqueríes de Margarita players
Guangdong Southern Tigers players
Houston Rockets players
Los Angeles D-Fenders players
Louisville Cardinals men's basketball players
Meralco Bolts players
New Jersey Nets draft picks
New Jersey Nets players
Philippine Basketball Association imports
Sacramento Kings players
Shooting guards
Small forwards
Springfield Armor players
Türk Telekom B.K. players